The Dongfeng Renault 2017 Chinese FA Women's Super Cup (Chinese: 东风雷诺2017中国足协女子超级杯) was the 16th Chinese FA Women's Super Cup, an annual football match contested by the winners of the previous season's Chinese Women's Super League and Chinese Women's Football Championship. The match was contested at Wuhan Sports Center Stadium by 2017 Chinese Women's Football Championship winners Shanghai, and Dalian Quanjian, champions of the 2017 Chinese Women's Super League, on 7 November 2017.

Match

Details

References 

Women's Super Cup